Saiq Airport  is an airport serving the city of Saiq in Oman.

There is high terrain west through northeast of the airport. Runway length includes  displaced thresholds on both ends.

See also
List of airports in Oman
Transport in Oman

References

External links
 OpenStreetMap - Saiq
 OurAirports - Saiq Airport
 
 FallingRain - Saiq Airport

Airports in Oman
Ad Dakhiliyah Governorate